The 1983 Queensland state election was held on 22 October 1983.

Retiring Members

Labor
Jim Blake MLA (Bundaberg)
Brendan Hansen MLA (Maryborough)
Ray Jones MLA (Cairns)

National
Val Bird MLA (Burdekin)
Des Frawley MLA (Caboolture)
Selwyn Muller MLA (Fassifern)
Vic Sullivan MLA (Condamine)
Ken Tomkins MLA (Roma)

Liberal
Llewellyn Edwards MLA (Ipswich)

Candidates
Sitting members at the time of the election are shown in bold text.

See also
 1983 Queensland state election
 Members of the Queensland Legislative Assembly, 1980–1983
 Members of the Queensland Legislative Assembly, 1983–1986
 List of political parties in Australia

References
 

Candidates for Queensland state elections